Dr. Sangeeta Shankar is an Indian violinist who performs Hindustani classical music.

Early life
Sangeeta Shankar was born in Banaras in a musical family to N. Rajam and T. S. Subramaniyan. Sangeeta started her training at a very early age in Hindustani music under the tutelage of her mother.

People often refer to her music as the "Singing Violin". She is the niece of T. N. Krishnan. Violinists Ragini Shankar and Nandini Shankar are her daughters. She currently resides in Mumbai.

Education

Dr.Sangeeta Shankar obtained her degrees in music from Banaras Hindu University.

Performing career
She first started performing on television when she was 8 years old.

She accompanied her mother at the age of 13, and gave a debut solo performance when she was 16. Sangeeta Shankar had also organized a festival of young musicians in Varanasi called 'Abhinav', during the year 1984-85. She performs not only in various states and provinces of India, but also in numerous countries around the globe. She plays violin in the Gayaki Ang. Sangeeta has performed across the globe and in numerous places throughout India. She has performed in various countries in Europe, extensively toured the United States and Canada, and performed in countries like Russia, Holland, Japan, Singapore to name a few.

She also conceived and created a TV serial of 26 episodes, named 'Swar Sadhana' in the year 2000. This serial was made for creating an awareness of Indian classical music among the masses. Its highlights were the interesting story format and the participation of various prominent celebrities like Madhuri Dixit, Javed Akhtar, Zakir Hussain, Birju Maharaj, Jagjit Singh, Naushad, Amol Palekar, Pankaj Udhas, Yukta Mookhey, Kanak Rele, Suresh Wadkar, N. Rajam, Sadhana Sargam, Shankar Mahadevan, Annu Kapoor, Veena Sahasrabuddhe, and many others.

Presently, she is the Director and founder of a music company, Legendary Legacy Promotions Pvt. Ltd., which consists of a storehouse of excellent classical music and also other exclusive products.

Currently, she is also educating the future film makers, imparting voice culture and music training at Whistling Woods International.

She is working on an educational project called 'Milaap', which aims to educate children about values and culture and inculcate an atmosphere of happiness, love and peace amongst humanity.

Dr. Sangeeta Shankar was recently awarded the prestigious Sangeet Natak Akademi award

Discography
 Tabula Rasa (Fusion) with Vishwa Mohan Bhatt and Bela Fleck, nominated in 1997 for Grammy Best World Music Award.
 Melody & Rhythm with Zakir Hussain
 Violin Dynasty (Raag Bageshree) with N. Rajam
 Aasha (Raag Jog)
 Kumari Sangeeta (Raag Bihag, Chayanat)
 Sensitive Strains of Violin (Raag Sohini, Bheem)
 A Delicate Touch (Raag Jogkauns, Desh)
 Together (Ragam Bhairavi, Malavi, Bilaharai, Todi) with N. Rajam
 Dedications to Dawn (Raag Mian ki Todi, Bairagi, Suha Sugharai)
 Sangeeta Shankar (Raag Todi, Bairagi)
 Music therapy for Migraine - Times Music (Raag Darbari Kanada)
 Saundarya (Raag Shyam Kalyaan)

References

1965 births
Hindustani instrumentalists
Indian violinists
Living people
Musicians from Mumbai
Tamil musicians
Women musicians from Maharashtra
21st-century violinists
21st-century women musicians
Recipients of the Sangeet Natak Akademi Award